The FV1620 Humber Hornet (FV1620, truck 1-ton, air portable, armoured launcher, Hornet launcher) was a specialised air-deployable armoured fighting vehicle designed to carry the Malkara, an anti-tank guided missile developed by Australia and the United Kingdom.

History
The Hornet was developed in the 1950s to provide British and Australian airborne units with an air-dropped long-range anti-tank capability. Based on the British Army's FV1611 Humber "Pig" one-ton four-wheel drive armoured truck, it carried two Malkara,  missiles on a retractable boom at the rear, as well as two reloads. It could be transported by air in a Blackburn Beverley and air-dropped on a cluster of 6 special parachutes.

Operation

The gunner fired the missiles from inside the cab and controlled them by means of a joystick attached to a wire which unreeled from the rear of the missile and connected to the sights. Electronic signals controlling the missile's flight were transmitted through the wire.

With a 27 kg warhead, the Malkara  missiles carried the largest warhead ever fitted to an anti-tank weapon and could destroy any tank in service at the time.

The vehicle remained in service with British units until being replaced in the 1970s by the Ferret armoured car Mk 5 equipped with Swingfire missiles. It was also operated by a squadron of the 2nd Royal Tank Regiment.

See also
 List of armoured fighting vehicles
 Malkara anti-tank missile
Comparable vehicles
 M551 Sheridan

References

Bibliography 
 

 "FV 1620 Humber "Hornet/Malkara" Anti-Tank Vehicle" WarWheels.net

External links 

 MilitaryFactory.com factsheet

Tank destroyers
Cold War armoured fighting vehicles of the United Kingdom
Airborne fighting vehicles
Military vehicles introduced in the 1950s